Julia Dietze (born 9 January 1981) is a German actress.

Biography
Dietze is the daughter of the German artist, illustrator and painter Mathias Dietze. Her mother is from Marseille. Julia Dietze grew up with her two younger sisters in Munich.

She gained her first film experience in the movies Soloalbum by Gregor Schnitzler, Do Fish Do It? from Almut Getto, and Love in Thoughts by Achim von Borries, and in some TV films, such as Ghetto Kids, Echte Männer? and Die Stimmen.

Her first TV starring role was in Mädchen Nr. 1, directed by Stefan Holtz.

In February 2009, it was announced that Dietze would play the lead role in the science fiction comedy Iron Sky by the Finnish independent director Timo Vuorensola. The film premiered in February 2012. She reprised her role in 2019's Iron Sky: The Coming Race.

In 2021, Dietze caused media outrage with a segment for the Daily Show when she compared U.S. health authorities' actions to combat the COVID-19 pandemic to "Hitler times." She also admitted that she was a pescatarian who took advice on her diet from her cat and medicine "from nature".

Filmography

 Films 
Do Fish Do It?  (2001)
Lili (2003)
Soloalbum (2003)
Love in Thoughts (2004)
Pura Vida Ibiza (2004)
Schwarze Erdbeeren (2005) – Black Strawberries
Liebes Leid und Lust (2006) – Love Pain and Pleasure
 (2006)
 (2005)
Ein Fall für KBBG (2007)
Warum du schöne Augen hast (2008) – Why Do You Have Beautiful Eyes
Little Paris (2008)
 (2008)
Robert Zimmermann Is Tangled Up in Love (2008)
1½ Knights – In Search of the Ravishing Princess Herzelinde (2008)
Lucky Fritz (2009)
205 - Room of Fear (2011)
Iron Sky (2012)
Berlin Kaplanı (2012)
Bullet (2014)
Fack ju Göhte 3 (2017)
Iron Sky: The Coming Race (2019)
Berlin, I Love You (2019)

References

External links

Living people
1981 births
Actresses from Munich
German film actresses
German television actresses
French emigrants to Germany
21st-century German actresses
People from Marseille